Ed Jackson (born 1948) is an American businessman and politician. He serves as a Republican member of the Tennessee Senate for the 25th district.

Early life
Ed Jackson was born on July 21, 1948 in Jackson, Tennessee.

Jackson was educated at the Jackson High School. He attended Lambuth College and graduated from Memphis State University. Jackson was a member of the Kappa Sigma fraternity in college.

Jackson served in the 30th Armored Division of the Army National Guard for seven years.

Career
Jackson started his career at the Southern Supply Company, where he worked for seven years. He worked as a salesman for the Tennant Company for three decades. With his wife, he co-owns Southern Comfort Coaches, Snappy Tomato Pizza and Marilyn Jackson's Gifts, three small businesses based in Jackson, Tennessee.

Since 2014, Jackson has served as a Republican member of the Tennessee Senate for District 27, encompassing parts of Madison County, Crockett County, Dyer County, Lake County and Lauderdale County.

Jackson serves on the board of trustees of the West Tennessee Area Council of the Boy Scouts of America. He is a member of the National Rifle Association.

Personal life
With his wife Marilyn, he has three children. He is a member of the Church of Christ.

References

Living people
1948 births
People from Jackson, Tennessee
University of Memphis alumni
Businesspeople from Tennessee
Republican Party Tennessee state senators
21st-century American politicians